Atomenergoprom (Atomic Energy Power Corporation, AEP) is a 100% state-owned holding company that unifies the Russian civil nuclear industry. It is a part of the Rosatom State corporation.

History
Atomenergoprom was created by a Presidential Decree signed by Vladimir Putin on 27 April 2007, following the adoption of a new law by the Russian Parliament on 19 January 2007, creating one of the world's largest nuclear companies. On 7 July 2007, the corporate charter and board of directors were approved.

Organization
Atomenergoprom includes nuclear power plant operator Rosenergoatom, nuclear fuel producer and supplier TVEL, uranium trader Tekhsnabexport (Tenex), nuclear facilities constructor Atomenergomash,  international nuclear construction and project management concern Atomstroyexport, and uranium mining company ARMZ Uranium Holding Co. (Atomredmetzoloto).  Among the Unitary Enterprises corporatized in a transfer of shareholdings from the government to Atomenergoprom are Novosibirsk State Design Research Institute VNIPIET, Zarubezhatomenergostroy All-Russian Production Association (Moscow), Lenatomenergostroy Specialized Construction-Installation Department (Sosnovy Bor, Leningrad oblast), Nizhniy Novgorod Research and Development Institute Atomenergoproekt, the Atom-Service department of Energoatom, Atomtekhenergro (Mytischi, Moscow Region), the Research and Development Institute for Nuclear Machinery Construction (VNIAEM, Moscow), Isotop All-Region Association (Moscow) and Atomspetstrans of Rosatom (Moscow).

Management
Sergei Kiriyenko, former Prime Minister of Russia and current head of the Rosatom State Corporation, chairs the board of directors. The director of the company is Vladimir Travin, deputy head of Rosatom; the first deputy director is Sergey Obozov, former director general of Rosenergoatom; and the deputy director is Petr Schedrovitsky, former President of the Russian Institute of Nuclear Power Plant Operators. Vladimir Smirnov, former director general of Tekhsnabexport is an adviser to the director. Igor Borovkov, Tatiana Elfimova and Ivan Kamenskikh, all of whom previously held senior posts at Rosatom, also hold directorial positions.

See also

 Energy policy of Russia
 Nuclear power in Russia
 Rosatom

References

External links
 Official website

Nuclear companies of Russia
Rosatom
Companies based in Moscow